Karol Mets (born 16 May 1993) is an Estonian professional footballer who plays as a centre back or defensive midfielder for St. Pauli on loan from Swiss club Zürich and the Estonia national team.

Club career

Tulevik
Mets came through the Tulevik youth system, and played for the club's reserve sides Tulevik II and Warrior.

Flora
In November 2010, Mets was included in Flora's first team squad for pre-season training. He made his debut for the club on 1 March 2011, against Levadia in the Estonian Supercup match. Flora won 5–3 on penalties. Mets made his debut in the Meistriliiga on 2 April 2011, in a 1–0 away victory over Kuressaare. He soon established himself as Flora's first choice centre back alongside Karl Palatu. Mets helped Flora win the Meistriliiga title in 2011.

Viking
On 5 December 2014, Mets signed a three-year contract with Norwegian club Viking. He made his debut in the Tippeligaen on 6 April 2015, in a 1–0 away loss to Mjøndalen.

NAC Breda
On 31 July 2017, Mets joined Eredivisie club NAC Breda on a three-year deal for an undisclosed fee, rumored to be around €100,000. He made his debut in the Eredivisie in a 4–1 away loss to Vitesse on 12 August 2017, when he came on as a half-time substitute for Arno Verschueren. Mets scored his first goal for NAC Breda on 20 September 2017, in a 4–3 loss to Achilles '29 in the first round of the KNVB Cup.

AIK
On 14 March 2019, Mets signed a three-year contract with Swedish champions AIK for a fee of €300,000. He made his debut in the Allsvenskan on 31 March 2019, in a 0–0 home draw against Östersund.

Al-Ettifaq
On 2 October 2020, Mets signed a three-year contract with Saudi club Al-Ettifaq.

CSKA Sofia
On 10 August 2021, Mets signed a contract with Bulgarian club CSKA Sofia until the end of 2021–22 season.

FC Zürich
On 7 January 2022, Mets signed with Swiss club Zürich until June 2024.

On 5 January 2023, Mets joined 2. Bundesliga club St. Pauli on loan until the end of the season with an option to buy.

International career

Mets has represented Estonia at under-17, under-18, under-19 and under-21 levels. He was named in the Estonia under-19 squad for the 2012 UEFA European Under-19 Championship in Estonia. Mets played in every group stage match, but failed to help the team progress to the semi-finals as Estonia lost all three games against Portugal, Greece and Spain.

Mets made his senior international debut for Estonia on 19 November 2013, in a 3–0 away victory over Liechtenstein in a friendly.

Career statistics

Club

International

Honours
Flora
Meistriliiga: 2011
Estonian Cup: 2012–13
Estonian Supercup: 2011, 2012

Zürich
Swiss Super League: 2021–22

Estonia
Baltic Cup: 2021

Individual
Estonian Young Footballer of the Year: 2014

References

External links

1993 births
Living people
Sportspeople from Viljandi
Estonian footballers
Association football defenders
Association football midfielders
Estonia international footballers
Estonia youth international footballers
Estonia under-21 international footballers
Esiliiga players
Meistriliiga players
Eliteserien players
Eredivisie players
Allsvenskan players
Saudi Professional League players
First Professional Football League (Bulgaria) players
Swiss Super League players
Viljandi JK Tulevik players
FC Warrior Valga players
FC Flora players
Viking FK players
NAC Breda players
AIK Fotboll players
Ettifaq FC players
PFC CSKA Sofia players
FC Zürich players
FC St. Pauli players
Estonian expatriate footballers
Estonian expatriate sportspeople in Norway
Expatriate footballers in Norway
Estonian expatriate sportspeople in the Netherlands
Expatriate footballers in the Netherlands
Estonian expatriate sportspeople in Sweden
Expatriate footballers in Sweden
Estonian expatriate sportspeople in Saudi Arabia
Expatriate footballers in Saudi Arabia
Expatriate footballers in Switzerland
Estonian expatriate sportspeople in Switzerland
Expatriate footballers in Germany
Estonian expatriate sportspeople in Germany